André Py (active 1899) was a French automobile designer. His voiturette was made by Cie des Automobiles du Sud Ouest of France in 1899.

References

Vintage vehicles
Defunct motor vehicle manufacturers of France
Year of birth missing
Year of death missing